The Charles Storz House is located at 1901 Wirt Street in the Kountze Place neighborhood of North Omaha, Nebraska. The Arts and Crafts style house was designed by the Omaha architectural firm of Fisher and Lawrie and built in 1909. In 1983 it was renovated as a historic preservation project involving the National Trust for Historic Preservation, Landmarks, Inc., the City of Omaha and the Consumer Services Organization. In 1984 it was designated an Omaha Landmark.

See also
Architecture in North Omaha, Nebraska
Gottlieb Storz House - Charles' father's house.

External links
"A History of North Omaha's Charles Storz House" by Adam Fletcher Sasse for NorthOmahaHistory.com

References

Houses in Omaha, Nebraska
Landmarks in North Omaha, Nebraska
Omaha Landmarks
Storz family